is a 2005 Japanese horror film and the sequel to the 2004 J-Horror film One Missed Call.

Plot
Kindergarten teacher Kyoko Okudera's friend Madoka Uchiyama invites her to dinner at a Chinese restaurant, where Kyoko's boyfriend, Naoto Sakurai, works part-time at. The chef, Mr. Wang, receives the cursed phone call from his daughter, Meifeng's phone, redirecting the curse to inflict on him. Meifeng later arrives with a new phone and exchanges her new phone number with Kyoko and Madoka, the latter receiving the cursed call right afterward. Naoto heads to the kitchen and discovers Mr. Wang dead with half his face burned off.

Journalist Takako Nozoe heads to the crime scene, learning from Detective Motomiya about traces of coal found in Mr. Wang's body as well as the fact that Yumi Nakamura is still declared missing ever since she killed Hiroshi Yamashita a year before. She personally questions Naoto the next day and tells him about the cursed call, the victims it claimed over the previous year, and its origin: Mimiko Mizunuma. Meanwhile, Kyoko's video chat with Madoka is interrupted when the former sees a black-haired figure about to reach her through the phone. She heads to Madoka's residence but is too late to stop her from being mutilated in the shower. Shortly after Naoto and Takako arrive, Kyoko receives the cursed call.

To help solve the case, Motomiya orders autopsies on all cursed call victims, including Mimiko, all of whom show positive of having traces of coal dust. In the meantime, Kyoko, Naoto, and Takako visit Mimiko's grandmother, who speaks of Mimiko being the daughter of a lunatic, who was killed by her Taiwanese husband. While serving his term, he felt chased by a little girl and decided to move to his hometown, Taipei, after his release. Takako contacts her estranged husband, Yuting Chen, who lives in Taipei, and from him learns that similar deaths related to cursed calls also happen all over Taiwan. Takako flies to Taipei to personally visit Mimiko's grandfather, only to find his rotten corpse while holding a cellphone.

Kyoko and Naoto decide to follow and help Takako to resolve the curse and she informs them that she found that the curse originally started from an abandoned coal mining town. The only survivor of the town recounts that a girl called Li Li had the power to verbally curse someone into their imminent death. The enraged town residents sewed her mouth shut and sealed her alive in the mines. Takako then receives a call from Yuting, who has received the cursed call.

Heading to the town, the trio split up. Takako receives a call from Motomiya, who tells her that Yumi Nakamura's body has been found and that she was actually evil all along, rather than possessed by Mimiko, before the call abruptly cuts off. She heads into an open mine, encounters Mimiko, and passes out. After having a dream where she stops her twin sister, who died after receiving the cursed call years ago, from answering the ringing payphone, she wakes up and races to Yuting's apartment. She arrives right when his time is exhausted, yet since nothing happens, she concludes that her sister has saved them. Meanwhile, Naoto manages to free Kyoko from Li Li's trap, but when he realizes that Li Li will never release Kyoko, he sacrifices himself by answering Kyoko's phone call and taking her place.

Takako is informed that Motomiya had died the day before while going to see Yumi's body, raising her suspicions. At the same time, Kyoko becomes confused when the police reveal that two bodies were found in the mines. Takako heads to Yuting's apartment and finds him dead in the bathroom, which she learns is her own doing from a video recorder. Checking her cellphone, she finds that she also receives a cursed call dated 5:58 PM, yet the current time is 8:05 PM: she realizes that she had died in the mines under the hands of Mimiko, who used her image to kill Yuting. Spitting a red hard candy, she smiles and drops it as the death ringtone is heard.

Cast
 Mimula as 
 Yū Yoshizawa as 
 Chisun as 
 Asaka Seto as 
 Peter Ho as 
 Shadow Liu as 
 Hakobu Okubo as 
 Karen Oshima as 
 Nana Koizumi as 
 Toshie Kobayashi as 
 Mariko Tsutsui as 
 Renji Ishibashi as 
 Haruko Wanibuchi as 
Kou Shibasaki, Shinichi Tsutsumi, Kazue Fukiishi, Anna Nagata, Atsushi Ida, and Kana Ito additionally appear as Yumi Nakamura, Hiroshi Yamashita, Natsumi Konishi, Yoko Okazaki, Kenji Kawai, and Rina Tsuchiya, respectively, through archive footage from the first film.

External links
 Official site
 
 
 

2005 horror films
Japanese horror films
One Missed Call
Toho films
Yasushi Akimoto
2005 films
Fiction about curses
Japanese ghost films
Japanese supernatural horror films
Japanese sequel films
2000s Japanese films

ja:着信アリ#「着信アリ2」